Showstopper or Show Stopper may refer to:

Film and television
 "Show Stopper" (CSI: Miami), an episode of the TV show
 "Show Stoppers", an episode of Garfield and Friends
 "Showstoppers" (The Simple Life episode)

Music

Albums
 Showstoppers (album), by Barry Manilow, 1991
 American Idol Season 4: The Showstoppers, 2005 album from the American Idol compilation series

Songs
 "Show Stopper" (Danity Kane song), 2006
 "Show Stopper", a song by Peaches from I Feel Cream, 2009
 "Showstopper" (TobyMac song), 2010
 "Showstopper", a song by Brandon & Leah, circa 2012
 "The Showstoppa", by Salt-N-Pepa, 1985

Other
 Showstopper! The Improvised Musical, a musical theatre show founded in London in 2008
 The Showstoppers, an American soul group, active 1967–1972

Other uses
 Shawn Michaels (born 1965), nicknamed The Showstopper, professional wrestler 
 Showstopper, or showstopper bug, a severe software bug
 Showstopper of the Year ESPY Award, awarded during the 1990s
 Showstopper American Dance Championships, an American dance competition

See also